Rhododendron laetum is a rhododendron species native to the Anggi Lakes area of the Arfak Mountains in Indonesia and western New Guinea, where it grows at forest edges, in open marsh, and in swamps at the edge of lakes. The flowers are deep yellow, flushing with red or orange as they age.

References
 "R. uliginosum", J.J.Sm., Nova Guinea 1914. 12: 136, t.33.
 Encyclopedia of Life
 Hirsutum.com
 
 Hybrids of Rhododendron laetum
 UniProt DNA-directed RNA polymerase
 "Rhododendron laetum - Collection and Distribution", Brian Clancy, The Rhododendron, Journal of the Australian Rhododendron Society, Volume 30, Spring 1990.

laetum